The FMA AeMB.2 Bombi was a bomber aircraft developed in Argentina in the mid-1930s. It was a low-wing cantilever monoplane of conventional configuration. It was fitted with fixed tailwheel undercarriage, the main units of which were covered by long, "trouser"-style fairings. The initial AeMB.1 configuration was fitted with a dorsal machine gun turret, later removed from the AeMB.2 to improve stability. Fifteen production examples saw service with the Argentine Air Force between 1936 and 1945. Two were lost to air accidents.

Variants
 AeMB.1 - initial design with dorsal gun turret
 AeMB.2 - improved design, turret removed to improve stability

Specifications (AeMB.2)

See also

References

 
 
 

AeMB002
1930s Argentine bomber aircraft
Low-wing aircraft
Single-engined tractor aircraft
World War II military equipment of Argentina
Light bombers